Frank Graves Dickey (December 1, 1917 in Wagoner, Oklahoma – August 7, 2009 in Lexington, Kentucky) was the fifth president of the University of Kentucky, from 1956 to 1963.

Dickey graduated summa cum laude with a B.A. degree from Transylvania College in 1939, and received both his Master of Arts degree and a Doctorate of Education from the University of Kentucky in 1942 and 1947, respectively. In 1951 he was inducted into Omicron Delta Kappa at the University of Kentucky.  Following service in World War II, Dickey was appointed to the faculty of the University of Kentucky College of Education, where he rose to Dean.

University of Kentucky presidency
In 1956, at the age of 38, Dickey became the youngest person to become the president of the University of Kentucky.  His main accomplishment was the establishment of the Chandler Medical Center, including the Albert B. Chandler Hospital, College of Medicine, Dentistry and Nursing. He also oversaw the opening of UK's Patterson School of Diplomacy. In 2002 he was awarded the Laurel Crowned Circle Award, Omicron Delta Kappa's highest honor.

Dickey resigned as president to become director of the Southern Association of Colleges and Schools.  He later became provost of the University of North Carolina at Charlotte.  He died on August 7, 2009 after a long illness.

Legacy
One of the buildings of the UK College of Education, Dickey Hall, is named for Dr. Dickey.

References

External links
Biography at University of Kentucky

1917 births
2009 deaths
People from Wagoner, Oklahoma
Presidents of the University of Kentucky
20th-century American academics